is a 1988 computer game, developed and published by Konami exclusively for the MSX platform in 1988. It was only released in Japan and Europe. The game is part of the long running Gradius series of side-scrolling shooters and is a spin-off of Gradius II: Gofer no Yabou. It is the second game of the series to be released exclusively for the MSX after Nemesis 2. In terms of the story; the game is a sequel to Gradius II, Nemesis 2, and the MSX conversion of Salamander. The game takes place almost 200 years after the crisis with Dr. Venom and James Burton has died in the year 6718. The Vic Viper is replaced by a new ship called the Vixen (4 classes); piloted by David Burton, a direct descendant of James who is assisted by his AI Gaudie.

Gameplay
Four distinct classes of Vixen can be chosen. The first one resembles the original Vic Viper. The second one is a twisted version of Vic Viper, featuring the new "Photon Missile". The third one is more like Metalion from Nemesis 2, featuring "Napalm Missile" and (Extended) "Fire Blaster". The fourth one is more like the Sabel Tiger from Salamander, featuring the 2-way missile approach and "Ripple Laser". All four classes may choose between the classic "Shield" or the "Force Field", which takes less hits to expire, but protects from any direction. It is also possible to choose the behavior of "Option", from the original shadow movement, "Fixed" and "Rolling", like the "Option Warrior" from Nemesis 2.

The game retains several of the new weapons introduced in Nemesis 2 like "Up Laser", "Fire Blaster" and "Vector Laser" as well as Salamander weapons like "Meteor Laser" and "Screw Laser". This is the only game in the Nemesis series which visibly keeps track of the number of speed boosts. In order to upgrade the ship's weapons, secret spots must be found, just like the secret stages in Nemesis 2 and the predictions in Salamander.

References

External links
Information about stage selects (via Internet Archive)

1988 video games
D4 Enterprise games
Gradius video games
MSX games
MSX2 games
Video games developed in Japan
Video games scored by Michiru Yamane
Virtual Console games
Virtual Console games for Wii U